Weguelin is a surname. Notable people with the surname include:

Christopher Weguelin (1838–1881), Irish politician
John Reinhard Weguelin (1849–1927), English painter and illustrator
Thomas Matthias Weguelin (1809–1885), English politician